Jane Elizabeth Kennedy ( Hodgson; born 4 May 1958) is a British politician and the inaugural Merseyside Police and Crime Commissioner. She was Member of Parliament (MP) for Liverpool Wavertree, formerly Liverpool Broadgreen, from 1992 to 2010.

Formerly a member of the Government, on 8 June 2009, she returned to the backbenches leaving her position as Minister of State for Farming and the Environment at the Department for Environment, Food and Rural Affairs.

Originally a member of the Labour Party, she left the party in March 2019 after the resignation of her successor, Luciana Berger MP, and the announcement that former Liverpool City councillor Derek Hatton - a former member of the Militant tendency - had been re-admitted to party membership.

Early life
She was born in Whitehaven, Cumberland, and attended Haughton Comprehensive School (now part of the 'Education Village') on Rockwell Avenue in Haughton Le Skerne, then Queen Elizabeth Sixth Form College in Darlington. She studied Chemistry at the University of Liverpool from 1976 until 1978, however did not graduate from her studies, deciding to marry and settle with her family in Liverpool. She worked in social care for Liverpool City Council from 1979–88, and in 1988 she became a trade union Area Organiser for the National Union of Public Employees (NUPE) until 1992. In Liverpool she had been active in ending the Militant group's infiltration of the Liverpool Labour Party.

Member of Parliament
Kennedy had been a Member of Parliament since the 1992 general election, when she was elected for the Liverpool Broadgreen constituency. She served as a member of the social security select committee from 1992 to 1994, and in 1995 she was appointed as a Labour whip.

Her constituency was abolished for the 1997 general election, but she was returned to Parliament for the new Liverpool Wavertree constituency. After Labour's victory in the 1997 election, she served as an assistant government whip until 1998 and as a government whip until 1999, sitting on the House of Commons administration select committee from 1997 until 1999.

On 9 November 2009 she announced she would be standing down at the 2010 general election. It was announced in January 2010 the Wavertree Labour Party had picked Luciana Berger as the candidate to succeed her. This selection caused some controversy because Berger had stayed at Kennedy's home for a period before the selection, a home Kennedy shares with her partner Peter Dowling, the local Labour Party's agent.

In government
Kennedy was appointed as a junior minister in the Lord Chancellor's Department from 1999 until 2001, when she became a Minister of State in the Northern Ireland Office with responsibility for security and the justice system. After the suspension of the Northern Ireland Assembly in October 2002, she also became responsible for education and employment in the province. In 2003, she was made a Privy Councillor.

She transferred to the Department for Work and Pensions in 2004 and then to the Department of Health after the 2005 general election, remaining a Minister of State.  She left the government on 5 May 2006 during a wide-ranging reshuffle. She was initially thought by journalists to have been sacked; however, she subsequently said she took the opportunity to resign from the government in light of concerns about the impact of the government's policies on the National Health Service.

In Gordon Brown's first government since becoming Prime Minister, Kennedy was appointed as the Financial Secretary to the Treasury, becoming the third ranked minister in the Treasury, taking on the ministerial responsibilities of the old Paymaster General, Dawn Primarolo. On 5 October 2008, Kennedy was promoted to Minister of State at the Department for Environment, Food and Rural Affairs with the portfolio of Farming and the Environment. She resigned that position in June 2009 in protest at Gordon Brown's Leadership.

Police and Crime Commissioner
Kennedy was elected to the post of Merseyside Police and Crime Commissioner on 15 November 2012. She was re-elected in 2016.

Expenses row
In 2009 the Houses of Parliament started publishing MP expenses. Her partner Peter Dowling worked at her office handling research and parliamentary affairs, and was paid out of her parliamentary expenses.

Personal life
Jane married Malcolm Kennedy in 1977 in Knowsley; they divorced in 1998. They have two sons, Robert (born 1978) and Alan (born 1983). She currently lives with her partner Peter Dowling.

Notes

References

External links
 Jane Kennedy's website
 
 Guardian Unlimited Politics - Ask Aristotle: Jane Kennedy MP
 TheyWorkForYou.com - Jane Kennedy MP
 BBC Politics

Video clips
 

1958 births
Living people
Labour Party (UK) MPs for English constituencies
UK MPs 1992–1997
UK MPs 1997–2001
UK MPs 2001–2005
UK MPs 2005–2010
People from Darlington
Alumni of the University of Liverpool
Members of the Privy Council of the United Kingdom
Northern Ireland Office junior ministers
Female members of the Parliament of the United Kingdom for English constituencies
Members of the Parliament of the United Kingdom for Liverpool constituencies
Police and crime commissioners in England
People from Whitehaven
Labour Party police and crime commissioners
20th-century British women politicians
21st-century British women politicians
Women government ministers in the United Kingdom
20th-century English women
20th-century English people
21st-century English women
21st-century English people